Feeneyism is a Christian doctrine, associated with Leonard Feeney, which advocates an interpretation of the dogma extra Ecclesiam nulla salus ("outside the Church there is no salvation") which is that only Catholics can go to heaven and that only those baptised with water can go to heaven. Feeneyism opposes the doctrines of baptism of desire and baptism of blood as well as the view that non-Catholics can go to heaven.

Feeneyism is considered a heresy by the Catholic Church; some Catholics refer to Feeneyism as the Boston heresy.

Leonard Feeney

Feeney was a Roman Catholic priest and a member of the Jesuit order. The order dismissed Feeney in 1949 for disobedience; later, on 4 February 1953, the Holy Office declared him excommunicated "on account of grave disobedience to Church Authority, being unmoved by repeated warnings."

Feeney co-founded the group known as the Slaves of the Immaculate Heart of Mary with Catherine Goddard Clarke.

Feeney reconciled with the Catholic Church in 1972 without any recantation from his part.

Doctrine 
The doctrine of Feeneyism is associated with the position of Leonard Feeney (1897–1978), a Jesuit priest of Boston, on the doctrine extra Ecclesiam nulla salus. Feeneyism's interpretation of the doctrine extra Ecclesiam nulla salus ("outside the Church there is no salvation") is that only Catholics can go to heaven and that only those baptised with water can go to heaven. Feeneyism opposes the doctrines of baptism of desire and baptism of blood as well as the view that non-Catholics can go to heaven.

Feeneyism is considered a heresy by the Catholic Church; some Catholics refer to Feeneyism as the Boston heresy.

Feeney rejected what was the definition of the Catholic Church of baptism of desire at the time, i.e. the idea that people who openly affiliated with the Catholic Church as well as those spiritually linked to the Catholic Church through an implicit desire could be saved.

Fr. Feeney wrote in his 1952 book Bread of Life:

Condemnation of Feeneyism 
In a 1949 letter to Cardinal Cushing, Archbishop of Boston, the Holy Office condemned Feeney's teaching that only those formally baptized in the Catholic Church can be saved. The Holy Office affirmed that those baptized by their desire can be saved. This letter was sent by Cardinal Francesco Marchetti Selvaggiani to Cardinal Cushing. This letter stated among other things:

This letter is referenced in a footnote of the Catechism of the Catholic Church, in its section "Outside the Church there is no salvation", paragraph 847, as well as in a footnote in Lumen gentium.

Feeneyite groups

 Slaves of the Immaculate Heart of Mary located in Richmond, New Hampshire
Most Holy Family Monastery

See also 

 Michael Müller (writer)

References

Further reading 

 

Catholic Church in the United States